Ludwig Dupal (born 17 April 1913, date of death unknown), also known as Louis Dupal, Ludvík Dupal or Ludwick Dupal, was a Czech football player and manager.

He played for SK Bata Zlin, FC Sochaux-Montbéliard and RC Besançon. After his playing career he became a coach in France, Switzerland, Belgium and Tunisia.

References

External links
 
 Profile at playerhistory 
 Biography at clubbrugge.be

1913 births
Year of death missing
People from Dubňany
People from the Margraviate of Moravia
Sportspeople from the South Moravian Region
Czechoslovak footballers
Czech footballers
Association football midfielders
Association football forwards
FC Sochaux-Montbéliard players
Racing Besançon players
Ligue 1 players
Ligue 2 players
Czechoslovak football managers
Czech football managers
Racing Besançon managers
RC Lens managers
AS Monaco FC managers
FC Nantes managers
FC Sochaux-Montbéliard managers
Club Brugge KV head coaches
RFC Liège managers
CS Hammam-Lif managers
AC Avigonnnais managers
Czechoslovak expatriate footballers
Czech expatriate football managers
Czechoslovak expatriate sportspeople in France
Expatriate footballers in France
Expatriate football managers in France
Czechoslovak expatriate sportspeople in Monaco
Expatriate football managers in Monaco
Czechoslovak expatriate sportspeople in Tunisia
Expatriate football managers in Tunisia
Czechoslovak expatriate sportspeople in Belgium
Expatriate football managers in Belgium
Czechoslovak expatriate sportspeople in Switzerland
Expatriate football managers in Switzerland
Urania Genève Sport managers